The 2015–16 AS Monaco FC season was the club's third season back in Ligue 1 since its promotion from Ligue 2 in 2013. Monaco participated in Ligue 1, the UEFA Champions League, the Coupe de France and the Coupe de la Ligue.

Players

Current squad

Reserve squad

Out on loan

Transfers

Summer

In:

Out:

Winter

In:

Out:

Friendlies

Competitions

Ligue 1

League table

Results summary

Results by round

Matches

Coupe de la Ligue

Coupe de France

UEFA Champions League

Qualifying rounds

Third qualifying round

Play-off round

UEFA Europa League

Group stage

Statistics

Appearances and goals

|-
|colspan="14"|Players away from the club on loan:

|-
|colspan="14"|Players who appeared for Monaco no longer at the club:

|}

Goalscorers

Disciplinary record

References

External links

AS Monaco FC seasons
Monaco
Monaco
AS Monaco
AS Monaco